Wetmore is a city in Nemaha County, Kansas, United States.  As of the 2020 census, the population of the city was 348.

History
Wetmore was founded in 1866 by the railroad company. It was named to honor W.T. Wetmore, a vice president of the Central Branch Union Pacific Railroad. Wetmore was incorporated in 1882.

Geography
Wetmore is located at  (39.634522, -95.809462).

Demographics

2010 census
As of the census of 2010, there were 368 people, 140 households, and 89 families residing in the city. The racial makeup of the city was 96.7% White, 0.3% African American, 1.9% Native American, and 1.1% from two or more races. Hispanic or Latino of any race were 1.9% of the population.

There were 140 households, of which 37.9% had children under the age of 18 living with them, 47.1% were married couples living together, 10.0% had a female householder with no husband present, 6.4% had a male householder with no wife present, and 36.4% were non-families. 30.7% of all households were made up of individuals, and 14.3% had someone living alone who was 65 years of age or older. The average household size was 2.63 and the average family size was 3.26.

The median age in the city was 31.5 years. 31% of residents were under the age of 18; 7.1% were between the ages of 18 and 24; 27.2% were from 25 to 44; 21% were from 45 to 64; and 13.9% were 65 years of age or older. The gender makeup of the city was 49.7% male and 50.3% female.

2000 census
As of the census of 2000, there were 362 people, 139 households, and 97 families residing in the city. The racial makeup of the city was 98.90% White, 0.55% Native American, and 0.55% from two or more races. Hispanic or Latino of any race were 0.28% of the population.

There were 139 households, out of which 33.1% had children under the age of 18 living with them, 56.1% were married couples living together, 10.1% had a female householder with no husband present, and 30.2% were non-families. 27.3% of all households were made up of individuals, and 12.2% had someone living alone who was 65 years of age or older. The average household size was 2.60 and the average family size was 3.19.

In the city, the population was spread out, with 30.7% under the age of 18, 6.6% from 18 to 24, 27.3% from 25 to 44, 18.0% from 45 to 64, and 17.4% who were 65 years of age or older. The median age was 36 years. For every 100 females, there were 92.6 males. For every 100 females age 18 and over, there were 87.3 males.

The median income for a household in the city was $38,438, and the median income for a family was $47,500. Males had a median income of $31,500 versus $24,375 for females. The per capita income for the city was $15,791. About 6.1% of families and 8.6% of the population were below the poverty line, including 7.1% of those under age 18 and 20.9% of those age 65 or over.

Education
The community is served by Prairie Hills USD 113 public school district, formed in 2010 by the merger of Sabetha USD 441 and Axtel USD 488.

Notable people
 Lee E. Geyer, California's 17th congressional district congressman.
 Zip Zabel, Major League relief pitcher for the Chicago Cubs.

References

External links

 Wetmore - Directory of Public Officials
 Wetmore city map, KDOT

Cities in Nemaha County, Kansas
Cities in Kansas
1866 establishments in Kansas
Populated places established in 1866